"Google Me" is the first single from American recording artist Teyana Taylor's debut mixtape, From a Planet Called Harlem. The track peaked at number 90 on the Billboard Hot R&B/Hip-Hop Songs chart.

The title of the single refers to the Google search engine.

Track listing
Promo single
"Google Me" (Main) - 3:20
"Google Me" (Main w/o intro) - 3:19
"Google Me" (Instrumental) - 3:19
"Google Me" (Acapella) - 3:02
"Google Me" (Acapella w/o Intro) - 2:49

Charts

References 

2008 debut singles
2007 songs
Teyana Taylor songs
Songs written by Ester Dean
Songs written by Jazze Pha
Songs written by Crystal Nicole